Sebastián Galán Rueda,  (born January 26, 1984 in Montevideo) is a Uruguayan footballer who plays for Canadian Soccer Club in the Uruguayan Segunda División.

Career 
The defender played during his career with Bella Vista, C.A. Basañez, Rampla Juniors, Montevideo Wanderers, Juventud de Las Piedras, Atenas de San Carlos, C.A. Cerro and CS Cerrito in Uruguay; as well for GC Biaschesi in Switzerland.

Teams
  Bella Vista (2004-2005)
  C.A. Basañez (2005-2006)
  Rampla Juniors (2007)
  Peñarol (2007)
  Montevideo Wanderers (2008)
  Juventud (2008-2009)
  Atenas (2009-2010)
  Cerro (2011)
  Biaschesi (2011)
  Cerrito (2012)
  Canadian Soccer Club (2013-now)

Notes

1984 births
Living people
Uruguayan footballers
Uruguayan expatriate footballers
C.A. Bella Vista players
Rampla Juniors players
Peñarol players
Montevideo Wanderers F.C. players
Atenas de San Carlos players
Juventud de Las Piedras players
C.A. Cerro players
Expatriate footballers in Switzerland
Association football defenders